Talmei Elazar (lit. Elazar Furrows or (Ridge) is a moshav in northern Israel. Located in the eastern Sharon plain to the north-east of Hadera, it falls under the jurisdiction of Menashe Regional Council.

History
The village was established in 1952 by residents of Zikhron Ya'akov and Jewish immigrants from Eastern Europe and Iran on the land to the west of depopulated Palestinian village of Khirbat al-Sarkas, and was named after Elazar Warmassar, one of the heads of the PJCA.

One of the residents runs a health and beauty span that offers snake massages. She uses California and Florida king snakes, corn snakes and milk snakes, claiming that contact with these reptiles is stress-relieving.

Located on the outskirts of the moshav is a carnivorous plant nursery where various species of plants are grown, among them the Nepenthes, which can capture frogs and even birds.

References

Moshavim
Agricultural Union
Populated places established in 1952
Populated places in Haifa District
1952 establishments in Israel
Iranian-Jewish culture in Israel